Fabio Mancini (born 11 August 1987) is an Italian male supermodel. He is best known for having been one of the top male models for Giorgio Armani, and for represented the brand for 15 consecutive years on both the runway and in various advertising campaigns.

Personal life
Fabio Mancini was born in Bad Homburg vor der Höhe, Germany to Italian parents and moved to Milan, Italy when he was four years old. His maternal grandfather is Indian. He currently lives in Milan.

Modeling career
Mancini entered the modeling industry as a professional in 2010 in Milan. He has participated in many events around the world with the following designers Giorgio Armani, Emporio Armani, Dolce & Gabbana, Dolce & Gabbana Alta Sartoria, Christian Dior, Bulgari, Damiani (jewelry company), Vivienne Westwood, Dirk Bikkembergs, Ermanno Scervino, Brioni.

Fabio has worked in advertising campaigns for Armani Jeans, Emporio Armani Underwear, Carolina Herrera, Aigner, Carlo Pignatelli, Vince Camuto, Pierre Cardin, Yamamay and L'Oréal. He has appeared on magazine covers including L'Officiel, Hachi Magazine and David Magazine and has also shot high fashion editorials for Harper's Bazaar, Esquire, Men's Health and Vogue.

In 2014, Armani launched a new underwear line, the Emporio Armani underwear Sensual Collection with a campaign directed by Andrea Dones, where Fabio became the face of the line for two seasons in a row. A video was also made and used to represent the icon tribute to the body for Giorgio Armani 40th Anniversary #ATTRIBUTE TO THE BODY N”20/40.

In 2016 Mancini became the new ambassador for Pierre Cardin underwear collection and for Yamamay with the American model Emily DiDonato, as well as being the face for the 2016-17 Armani Jeans winter collection.

In October 2017, Fabio appeared for the first time as a face in Armani Exchange's new Autumn/Winter denim 2017-2018 collection. He was photographed by American photographer David Mcknight-Peterson.

Activism 
On January 31, 2023, the Brussels based European policy analysis and debate think-tank Friends of Europe nominated and then chose Fabio Mancini  in the list of European Young Leaders, Class of 2023, as ambassador of Italy to their Forum due to his career in fashion industry including the collaboration with Giorgio Armani and for use of his social media platforms to help promote healthy values and his philanthropic efforts as volunteer at children’s hospitals as well as his project to tour schools to discuss issues surrounding body shaming and social media networks with young generations.

Reception and achievements 
 From 2014 to 2021, Models.com has included Mancini on the Sexiest Men's list.
 Vogue included Mancini on the best of 2015 Vogue Hommes Model fitness.
 Mancini appears in The 50 Hottest Male Models of All Time list by Out Magazine.
 Best five Italian Models during the Milan Fashion Week 2016 for Vogue
 Vogue's 15 favourite Dolce&Gabbana Models.
 Models.com included Fabio Mancini in the best "Social Media Star Men" of 2018.
 Vanity Fair celebrates Fabio Mancini for being for 10 years on the Giorgio Armani’s advertising campaigns and fashion shows: «Perché io?»

References

1987 births
Italian male models
Living people
Models from Milan
German emigrants to Italy
Italian people of Indian descent